S. Valarmathi  is an Indian politician and Former member of Tamil Nadu Legislative Assembly from Srirangam constituency is a Former MLA (Member of Legislative Assembly) from Srirangam constituency in Tamil Nadu.

She belongs to Muthuraja community. Jayalalithaa appointed Valarmathi as Minister for Backward Classes and Minority Welfare in May 2016. This was her first cabinet post in the Government of Tamil Nadu.

References

Posts held

All India Anna Dravida Munnetra Kazhagam politicians
Living people
Tamil Nadu MLAs 2016–2021
Year of birth missing (living people)
21st-century Indian women politicians
21st-century Indian politicians
State cabinet ministers of Tamil Nadu
Women members of the Tamil Nadu Legislative Assembly